Paul William Henderson (born 21 September 1964) is a former New Zealand rugby union player. He was a member of the New Zealand national side, the All Blacks, between 1989 and 1995, playing 25 matches for the team, including seven internationals. He captained the All Blacks on one occasion, in their 145–17 victory over Japan at the 1995 Rugby World Cup.

References

1964 births
Living people
People from Bluff, New Zealand
People educated at Southland Boys' High School
New Zealand rugby union players
New Zealand international rugby union players
Southland rugby union players
Otago rugby union players
Highlanders (rugby union) players
Rugby union flankers
Rugby union players from Southland, New Zealand